Tata Play (stylised as TΛTΛ PLΛY) is an Indian satellite television (DTH) service provider using MPEG-4 digital compression technology, transmitting using INSAT-4A and GSAT-10 satellite. Incorporated in 2005; it currently offers a total of 601 channels, 495 SD channels and 99 HD channels and services, along with many other value added services. As of March 2020, according to TRAI Tata Play serves 22 million subscribers which is 33.37% of total DTH users in India. Tata Play is the largest DTH service provider in India.

Tata Play entered into an agreement with French firm Technicolor to supply 4K set top boxes from early 2015. The company was formerly known as Tata sky.

History

Tata Sky was an equity strategic alliance in the nature of a joint venture between the Tata Group and News Corporation, which owned 80% and 20% stakes respectively until 2008, when Singapore-based Temasek Holdings picked up a 10% stake in Tata Play from the Tata Group. Tata Sky was incorporated in 2001, but launched services on 8 August 2006.

Tata Sky's parent company, 21st Century Fox, formerly owned an international group of DTH businesses that include Sky Italia in Italy and Sky UK in the United Kingdom. The company uses the Sky brand under a licence from Sky Group.

Tata Sky partnered with Ericsson to launch the first Video on Demand (VOD) services in India in 2012.

On 9 January 2015, Tata Sky became the first Indian DTH operator to offer 4K set-top-boxes to its consumers.

On 20 March 2019, The Walt Disney Company completed acquisition of 21st Century Fox, making them their new 30% stakeholder, replacing 21st Century Fox.

On 26 January 2022, Tata Sky was rebranded into Tata Play as the company decided to drop the 'Sky' brand name after 18 years.

On 4 September 2022, Tata Sons and the Walt Disney Company India finally agreed to launch an initial public offering (IPO) for the company after multiple failed attempts in 2013, 2016 and 2019. It has been reported that Disney may sell 10% of its current 30% share in order to abide by media cross-holding regulations, which limit broadcasters' equity in DTH companies to 20%. However, in December 2022, reports came of Disney completely exiting the company. Tata Sky is an Indian direct-to-home (DTH) television company, which offers over 600 channels and services.

Satellites

Tata Play was the second operator to launch DTH or direct-to-home services in 2006. At that time, the company decided to use an ISRO satellite. In 2005, Tata Play signed a contract with ISRO for provision of satellite space on the INSAT-4A satellite. In 2007, one year after the launch of the DTH player, Tata Play asked for more space to increase the number of channels they telecast. The extra space was promised in 2009 on the GSAT-10 satellite, a then to be launched satellite inducted into the INSAT system. The GSAT-10 was launched in September 2012, Tata Play has started utilising those transponders in March 2015.  The mission of INSAT-4A was over on 21 October 2019. Tata Play is using ISRO's GSAT-30  satellite which is a replacement satellite of INSAT-4A.

Awards and recognition
 
In March 2009, Tata Play became the first Indian DTH service provider to be awarded the ISO 27001: 2005 accreditation, the benchmark for information security. ISO 27001:2005 is an international standard that provides specifications and guidance for the establishment and proper maintenance of an Information Security Management System (ISMS).

See also
 Direct-to-home television in India

References

External links
 
 Tata Sky Free Channel List

High-definition television
Direct broadcast satellite services
Television networks in India
Indian brands
Tata Sons subsidiaries
Companies based in Mumbai
Indian companies established in 2006
Mass media companies established in 2006
Telecommunications companies established in 2006
Former News Corporation subsidiaries
2006 establishments in Maharashtra